The 2011–12 Women's A Basketball League of Serbia is the 6th season of the First Women's Basketball League of Serbia, the highest professional basketball league in Serbia. It is also 68th national championship played by Serbian clubs inclusive of nation's previous incarnations as Yugoslavia and Serbia & Montenegro.

The first half of the season consists of 12 teams and 132-game regular season (22 games for each of the 12 teams) began on 1 October 2011 and will end on 4 March 2012. The second part of the season consists of two parts, the playoffs and Play Out.

In the Play Off playing eight teams, 5 from Adriatic League and 3 from First Women's Basketball League of Serbia. In the Play Out playing six teams it turns out that the last team. After the regular season it turns the bottom team and one team in Play Out.

Team information

Regular season
The League of the season was played with 13 teams and play a dual circuit system, each with each one game at home and away. The three best teams at the end of the regular season were placed in the Play Off. The regular season began on 2 October 2011 and it will end on 4 March 2012.

Play Off
Play Off is played according to the cup system. Champion is received after the final was played. The final was played on 3 wins, while in other parts the Play Off at 2 victory. Play Off is played from 14. March 2012. to 8. April 2012.

Play Out
In play out all the clubs play against each other, and the worst ranked team in play out is relegation of the league. Play Out is played from 17. March 2012. - 13. May 2012.

Awards
Player of the Year: Aleksandra Katić (172-G-87) of Radnički Kragujevac
Guard of the Year: Aleksandra Katić (172-G-87) of Radnički Kragujevac
Forward of the Year: Sonja Marić (185-F-85) of Čelarevo
Center of the Year: Mirjana Velisavljević (188-C-78) of Šabac
Defensive Player of the Year: Kristina Milošević (177-F-90) of Radnički Kragujevac
Coach of the Year: Marina Maljković of Partizan

1st Team
PG: Milica Dabović (175-82) of Partizan
G: Saša Čađo (178-89) of Hemofarm
G: Aleksandra Katić (172-87) of Radnički Kragujevac
F: Ana Nikšić (181-91) of Crvena zvezda
C: Mirjana Velisavljević (188-78) of Šabac

2nd Team
G: Tamara Petković (170-89) of Jagodina 2001
G: Jelena Prvulović (177-91) of Radnički Kragujevac
F: Snježana Vasić (178-75) of Stara Pazova
C: Marija Ilić (190-85) of Student Niš
C: Jelena Marinkov (185-90) of Proleter Zrenjanin

Honorable Mention
Vida Emeše (188-F/C-93) of Spartak Subotica
Iva Musulin (170-G-84) of Stara Pazova
Marija Kovačić (197-C-78) of Jagodina 2001
Ivana Grubor (185-F/C-84) of Jagodina 2001
Danijela Varda (195-C-74) of Beočin

External links
 Women's A Basketball League of Serbia at eurobasket.com
 Regular season at srbijasport.net
 Play Off at srbijasport.net
 Play Out at srbijasport.net

First Women's Basketball League of Serbia seasons
Serbia
women